The 1939 Brownlow Medal was the 16th year the award was presented to the player adjudged the fairest and best player during the Victorian Football League (VFL) home and away season. Marcus Whelan of the Collingwood Football Club won the medal by polling twenty-three votes during the 1939 VFL season.

Leading votegetters 
* The player was ineligible to win the medal due to suspension by the VFL Tribunal during the year.

References 

1939 in Australian rules football
1939